Tatiana Matveeva, nicknamed Tata (born 25 July 1990), is a Georgian footballer, who plays as a forward. She played in the Turkish Super League for Fatih Karagümrük  with jersey number 7. She is a member of the Georgian national team since 2006.

Club career 
She began her career in Iveria Khashuri before moving to Turkey to play for Trabzonspor. She took part at the 2009–10 UEFA Women's Champions League - Group D matches.

When the team folded in 2011, she moved to Ataşehir Belediyespor. Enjoyed her second championship at the end of the 2011–12 season, she played at the 2012–13 UEFA Women's Champions League - Group 1 matches until her team's elimination. She scored two goals in three games.

In the beginning of the 2013–14 season's second half, she was transferred by the Izmir-based Konak Belediyespor.

She joined the 1207 Antalya Döşemealtı Belediyespor in the nsecond half of the 2016–17 Turkish Women's First Football League season, at which she capped three times. In October 2022, she moved to Turkey again, and joined Fatih Karagümrük to play in the 2022-23 Super League season.

International career 
Ta iana Matveeva is a member of the Georgian national team. She played at the UEFA Women's Euro 2013 qualifying round's three matches as the captain of the national team. At the 2015 FIFA Women's World Cup qualification (UEFA) - Group 2 matches, she captained again, capping three times and scoring one goal.

Career statistics

Honours 
 Turkish Women's First Football League
 Trabzonspor (women)
 Winners (1): 2008-09

 Ataşehir Belediyespor
 Winners (1): 2011-12
 Runners-up (1): 2012–13

 Konak Belediyespor
 Winners (2): 2013–14, 2014–15

References 

Living people
1990 births
Women's association football midfielders
Women's footballers from Georgia (country)
Georgia (country) women's international footballers
Expatriate women's footballers from Georgia (country)
Expatriate women's footballers in Turkey
Expatriate sportspeople from Georgia (country) in Spain
Expatriate women's footballers in Spain
Trabzonspor women's players
Ataşehir Belediyespor players
Konak Belediyespor players
1207 Antalya Spor players
UD Granadilla Tenerife players
Fatih Karagümrük S.K. (women's football) players
Expatriate sportspeople from Georgia (country) in Turkey